Bhalake may refer to:

 Bhalake (B.K.), a village in Karnataka, India
 Bhalake (K.H.), a village in Karnataka, India